Elisha Edward Meredith (December 26, 1848 – July 29, 1900) was a U.S. Representative from Virginia.

Biography
Born in Sumter County, Alabama, Meredith attended Hampden–Sydney College, Virginia.
He studied law.
He was admitted to the bar in 1869 and commenced practice in Prince William County.
He served as prosecuting attorney for Prince William County 1876-1883.
He served as member of the Senate of Virginia in 1883–1887.

In 1891 E. E. Meredith and Robert R. Campbell were the court appointed attorneys for Joseph Dye and Lee R. Heflin, white farm workers, who were tried for the murder of a white Fauquier County, Virginia, family (a widow and her three young children) during a robbery.  The killers attempted to cover up their crime by burning the house.  After the two killers were convicted and sentenced to death they were taken from sheriff’s deputies transporting them to another jail and lynched in Prince William County, Virginia.

Meredith was elected as a Democrat to the Fifty-second Congress to fill the vacancy caused by the death of William H.F. Lee.
He was reelected to the Fifty-third and Fifty-fourth Congresses and served from December 9, 1891, to March 3, 1897.
He resumed the practice of his profession.
He died in Manassas, Virginia, on July 29, 1900.
He was interred in Manassas Cemetery.

References

Sources

1848 births
1900 deaths
Virginia lawyers
Democratic Party Virginia state senators
Democratic Party members of the United States House of Representatives from Virginia
19th-century American politicians
19th-century American lawyers
People from Sumter County, Alabama
People from Prince William County, Virginia